Bala is a town in Tambacounda Region,  eastern Senegal.  It has a station on the main line of the Dakar–Niger Railway.

See also 

 Transport in Senegal
 Railway stations in Senegal

References 

Populated places in Tambacounda Region